Holocraspedon erkunin is a moth of the family Erebidae first described by Arnold Pagenstecher in 1885. It is found on Aru and New Guinea.

References

Lithosiini
Moths described in 1885